Jawahar Navodaya Vidyalaya Churu is one of the approximately 565 Jawahar Navodaya Vidyalayas in India. This school is located in Sardarshahar near Churu, Rajasthan about 130 kilometres from Bikaner. Jawahar Navodaya Vidyalayas are Indian schools for talented children. They form a part of the system of gifted education. The objectives of the scheme are to provide good quality modern education to the talented children predominantly from the rural areas, irrespective of their family's socio-economic condition.

The Vidyalaya is aimed at choosing and nurturing the academically talented children from the area and facilitating impartment of quality education to them, with a special focus on the rural area. This is evident by the fact that as much as 80% of the seats are reserved for the candidates hailing from the rural areas of the district. The idea is to make quality education accessible to the children in the rural areas who otherwise may be deprived of it in spite of their academic prowess.

Affiliations 
Jawahar Navodaya Vidyalaya Churu is a fully residential, co-educational school affiliated to the Central Board of Secondary Education,  and has classes from VI to XII standard. The CBSE affiliation number of school is 1740002, and JNV Churu follows the curriculum prescribed by the CBSE.

References

External links
 Official Website of JNV Churu
 Navodaya Vidyalaya Samiti

Jawahar Navodaya Vidyalayas in Rajasthan
Buildings and structures in Churu district
1986 establishments in Rajasthan
Educational institutions established in 1986